Cupid and Psyche is a story in Greek  and Roman myth.

Cupid and Psyche may also refer to:
 Cupid and Psyche (Capitoline Museums), a 1st or 2nd century CE Roman statue
 Cupid and Psyche (Thorvaldsen), a sculpture by Bertel Thorvaldsen
 Cupid and Psyche (van Dyck), a painting by Anthony van Dyck
 Cupid & Psyche 85, an album by art pop band Scritti Politti